Omiodes martyralis is a moth in the family Crambidae. It was described by Julius Lederer in 1863. It is found in Argentina, Venezuela, Brazil, Puerto Rico, Costa Rica and Mexico.

References

Moths described in 1863
martyralis